Maximal lotteries refers to a probabilistic voting system first considered by the French mathematician and social scientist Germain Kreweras in 1965. The method uses preferential ballots and returns so-called maximal lotteries, i.e., probability distributions over the alternatives that are weakly preferred to any other probability distribution. Maximal lotteries satisfy the Condorcet criterion, the Smith criterion, reversal symmetry, polynomial runtime, and probabilistic versions of reinforcement, participation, and independence of clones.

Maximal lotteries are equivalent to mixed maximin strategies (or Nash equilibria) of the symmetric zero-sum game given by the pairwise majority margins. As such, they have a natural interpretation in terms of electoral competition between two political parties. Moreover, they can be computed using linear programming. The voting system that returns all maximal lotteries is axiomatically characterized as the only one satisfying probabilistic versions of population-consistency (a weakening of reinforcement) and composition-consistency (a strengthening of independence of clones). A social welfare function that top-ranks maximal lotteries is characterized using Arrow's independence of irrelevant alternatives and Pareto efficiency. Maximal lotteries satisfy a strong notion of Pareto efficiency and a weak notion of strategyproofness. In contrast to random dictatorship, maximal lotteries do not satisfy the standard notion of strategyproofness. Also, maximal lotteries are not monotonic in probabilities, i.e., it is possible that the probability of an alternative decreases when this alternative is ranked up. However, the probability of the alternative will remain positive.

Maximal lotteries or variants thereof have been rediscovered multiple times by economists, mathematicians, political scientists, philosophers, and computer scientists.

Similar ideas appear also in the study of reinforcement learning and evolutionary biology to explain the multiplicity of co-existing species.

Collective preferences over lotteries 

While this relation is not necessarily transitive, it does always contain at least one maximal element.

It is possible that several such maximal lotteries exist, but unicity can be proven in the case where the margins between any pair of alternatives is always an odd number. This is the case for instance if there is an odd number of voters who all hold strict preferences over the alternatives. Following the same argument, unicity holds for the original "bipartisan set" that is defined as the support of the maximal lottery of a tournament game.

Example 
Suppose there are five voters who have the following preferences over three alternatives:
 2 voters: 
 2 voters: 
 1 voter: 

By definition, this is also the unique maximal lottery of the preference profile above. The example was carefully chosen not to have a Condorcet winner. Many preference profiles admit a Condorcet winner, in which case the unique maximal lottery will assign probability 1 to the Condorcet winner.

References

External links 
voting.ml (website for computing maximal lotteries)
Pnyx - Practical Preference Aggregation (voting tool that, among other methods, offers maximal lotteries)
 votation.ovh (French website for computing maximal lotteries)

Preferential electoral systems